The Punisher is a 2004 American vigilante action film based on the Marvel Comics character of the same name, directed by Jonathan Hensleigh, written by Hensleigh and Michael France. It stars Thomas Jane as the antihero Frank Castle and John Travolta as Howard Saint, a crime boss who orders the death of Castle's entire family.

The film's story and plot were mainly based on two Punisher comic book stories: the 1994 miniseries The Punisher: Year One by writers Dan Abnett and Andy Lanning, and the 2000-01 miniseries Welcome Back, Frank by writer Garth Ennis, though some scenes were derived from other Punisher stories, such as Marvel Preview Presents: The Punisher #2, Marvel Super Action Featuring: The Punisher #1, The Punisher War Zone, and The Punisher War Journal. The Punisher was shot on location in Tampa, Florida and environs in mid to late 2003. It was distributed by Lions Gate Films in North America, although Artisan Entertainment, which released a 1989 film adaptation of the same name on DVD, financed and co-distributed the film with eventual Artisan owner Lionsgate, while Columbia Pictures distributed the film in non-North American territories. Screenwriter Jonathan Hensleigh agreed to helm the film during its development stage despite a dispute with Marvel Studios, marking his directorial debut.

The film was released on April 16, 2004, by Lions Gate Films and Columbia Pictures, grossing $13 million in the United States over its opening weekend, and reached a total gross of $54 million against a budget of $33 million. Reviews were generally negative. Marvel Comics and Lionsgate began development on a sequel, The Punisher 2, which instead became the 2008 reboot Punisher: War Zone after Jane and Hensleigh left the project due to creative differences. This was the final film produced by Artisan Entertainment for theatrical distribution.

Plot
An FBI bust of smuggling operation in Tampa results in the deaths of Bobby Saint, the son of mafia boss Howard Saint, and Otto Krieg, an arms dealer. However, Krieg's death was faked, and he is revealed to be undercover FBI agent Frank Castle on his final mission before retirement. Enraged at the death of his son, Saint orders his men to learn everything they can about Krieg, and acquires access by bribing corrupt federal law enforcement officers for his federal service history. He orders Castle killed at a family reunion in Puerto Rico, though Saint's wife Livia insists that Castle's family be killed as well. At the reunion, Saint's men, including Saint's best friend Quentin Glass, and Bobby's identical twin John, kill Castle's entire family. Though Frank Castle Sr. takes down some of the attackers, John then shoots Castle, leaving him for dead. However, Castle survives and is nursed back to health by a local fisherman.

With the police and FBI unwilling to pursue the killers due to Saint's power and influence, Castle moves into an abandoned apartment occupied by three outcasts—Joan, Bumpo, and Spacker Dave—and begins his mission to bring the Saints down. With the help of information provided by Mickey Duka, Saint's less malevolent henchman, Castle studies the Saint family and learns their every move, during which he discovers Glass to be a closeted homosexual. He openly attacks Saint's business and sabotages his partnership with his Cuban partners.

Saint discovers Castle is alive and sends assassins to kill him. The first, Harry Heck, ambushes Castle on a bridge, but is killed when Castle fires a ballistic knife into his throat. The second, a Russian behemoth, nearly beats Castle to death in his own apartment, but Castle manages to kill him as well. The tenants treat Castle's wounds and hide him in his hidden elevator as Saint's men arrive for him. When Dave and Bumpo refuse to reveal Castle's hideout, Glass tortures Dave by plucking each of his piercings with pliers. They leave one of their men to intercept Castle, but Castle kills him after they leave.

With Mickey's help, Castle poses as an anonymous blackmailer and arranges for Glass to be at certain places while planting Livia's car in the same location, and ultimately placing one of Livia's earrings in Glass's bed. When Saint finds the earrings, he stabs Glass to death and, despite her protest that Glass was gay, accuses Livia of having an affair with his best friend. He throws Livia off an overpass onto a railroad track, where she is run over by a train.

With Saint despondent, Castle assaults Saint's club and kills every member of his mob, including his remaining son John. Saint escapes the building, albeit wounded. Castle pursues him and shoots him in a duel. As Saint lies dying, Castle reveals his schemes that led Saint to kill his friend and wife. He ties Saint to a car and sends it into the club's parking lot, which is rigged with explosives, prompting a set of explosions that kills Saint, and which forms the shape of a skull when viewed from the air.

Castle returns home and prepares to kill himself with his mission fulfilled, but changes his mind after seeing a vision of his wife, instead deciding to continue to fight crime. He leaves some of Saint's money as a farewell gift to the tenants for protecting him. He is then seen standing alone on the Sunshine Skyway Bridge at sunset, where, in a voice-over, he vows to kill all killers, rapists, psychopaths, sadists, and anyone else who harms innocent people in any way in his new identity, the Punisher.

Cast

Hensleigh and Arad have said in many interviews that Jane was the first and only actor to be asked to play the title role. Arad had previously pursued Jane for other roles in Marvel Studios films. He turned down the Punisher twice, as he did not see himself as a superhero actor. Jane said, when asked the second time to play the Punisher, that he became interested when Arad sent Tim Bradstreet's artwork of the character. After learning more about the Punisher, he accepted. Jane went on to read as many Punisher comics he could find to understand the character, and became a fan of the Punisher in the process. Jane trained for six to seven months with the United States Navy SEALs and gained more than twenty pounds of muscle for the part.

Production

Marvel Studios began development for a new Punisher film as early as 1997. In 2000, Marvel made a long-term agreement with Artisan Entertainment to turn 15 of their characters into films and TV shows, among them The Punisher with Gale Anne Hurd to produce. The Punisher marked Marvel's first major independent release as an equity owner, whereby it contributes characters and creative support to lower-budget pics in exchange for a financial stake in the negative cost. Screenwriter Jonathan Hensleigh signed on in April 2002, and The Punisher also became his directing debut. The story and plot were mainly based on two Punisher comic book stories, Welcome Back, Frank and The Punisher: Year One. Hensleigh explained he had to excise much of the influence from Welcome Back, Frank as it would have likely been a four-hour-long film.

Before filming began, Hensleigh was not given the budget he wanted or needed from the studio, Hensleigh knew that most action pictures get a budget of around $64 million. He was only given $33 million, with only $15.5 million going towards the shooting budget and post-production for the film, with only 52 days to shoot, which is half the time allocated for most action pictures. Most of Hensleigh's original script had to be edited and re-written many times due to budget issues. According to the DVD commentary, the first scene in the film would have been a battle set in Kuwait during the Gulf War, but they were unable to film this scene as a result of the budget cuts.

Principal photography for The Punisher began in July 2003 on location in Tampa, Florida. Filming finished October 14, 2003 after 52 days of filming. The Florida location was first chosen at the insistence of screenwriter Michael France, who advised Marvel and Artisan that "it would be cheap to shoot [there]—that they'd get a lot more for their money than in New York or Chicago" as well as wanting to use "both sunny locations, and dark, industrial locations" in the screenplay. For inspiration, Hensleigh and cinematographer Conrad W. Hall looked at dozens of action films from the 1960s and 1970s, such as the Dirty Harry series, The Getaway, The Good, the Bad and the Ugly, The Godfather and Bonnie and Clyde. In an interview, Hensleigh also stated the film pays homage to Mad Max and William Shakespeare's Othello, though while he was inspired by Othello, the characters were reversed for the film, making the Punisher the instigator of the jealousy which leads to Howard Saint murdering his best friend and wife.

After shooting, Lionsgate (then known as Lions Gate Films) purchased Artisan. In an interview, Hensleigh said that even though the film is distributed under the Lionsgate imprint, they had nothing to do with the film. Lionsgate never gave a green light for the film to be made. The film was still under Artisan Entertainment. During shooting of a fight scene, Jane legitimately stabbed Nash in the collarbone with a blunted butterfly knife after a stunt co-ordinator forgot to change the props. Nash did not break character and continued the scene and accepted cold beers from the crew as compensation.

The character of Microchip was originally included in an earlier Michael France draft (along with the character Jigsaw), but was excised from later drafts because of director Jonathan Hensleigh's distaste for him. Instead the character of Mickey Duka (who was heavily based upon the character Mickey Fondozzi) serves as an ally of Frank Castle. Regarding the exclusion of Microchip, Hensleigh had this to say:

Reception

Box office
The Punisher opened in 2,649 theaters on April 16, 2004, and grossed $13.8 million over its opening weekend, ranking at #2 at the box office, behind Kill Bill: Volume 2. The film has a US gross of $33.8 million and an international gross of $20.9 million, giving it a worldwide total of $54.7 million.

Critical response
On Rotten Tomatoes the film has an approval rating of 29% based on reviews from 170 critics, with an average rating of 4.5/10. The website's critical consensus states: "A good cast fails to elevate this overly violent and by-the-numbers revenge flick."  On Metacritic the film has a weighted average score of 33 based on reviews from 36 critics, indicating "generally unfavorable reviews". Audiences surveyed by CinemaScore gave the film a grade of B+.

Film critic Roger Ebert gave the film two stars, stating, "The Punisher is so grim and cheerless, you wonder if even its hero gets any satisfaction from his accomplishments." Joe Leydon of Variety describes the film as "depressingly rote and sometimes laughably silly". Leydon praises Jane for his "appropriate physicality and brooding gravitas" but criticizes Travolta, saying he does "nothing to inject fresh life into bland archetype".

Some reviewers defended the film, stating that, compared to most comic book-based films, it is a well-done throwback to the old-school action films of the 1960s and 1970s. Critic A. O. Scott stated, "But lightness is not among Hensleigh's gifts. Making his directorial debut after a successful run as a screenwriter and producer (on projects like Die Hard with a Vengeance, Jumanji, and The Rock) he has clearly conceived The Punisher as a throwback to the leathery, angry urban revenge movies of the 1970s."

Drew McWeeny of Ain't It Cool News said of the style of the film that "The Punisher has more in common with the work of Don Siegel and John Frankenheimer than it does with the work of Michael Bay or Simon West. Which isn't to say that it's the equal of those classics, but at least Hensleigh's got the right idea. ... The Punisher is pulp, served up gritty and ugly and brutal. It's not jam-packed full of one-liners. What humor there is in the film is dark."

Home media

The film was released via DVD on September 7, 2004 and sold nearly 1.8 million copies in its first five days and netted $10.8 million in rentals its first week, making it number one in DVD sales that week.

An extended cut DVD was released on November 21, 2006 with 17 minutes of additional footage, most of which revolves around the character Jimmy Weeks (Russell Andrews), and Castle realizing that it was his friend who had sold him out to Howard Saint. In retaliation, Castle forces Weeks to commit suicide. Features also include a black-and-white stop-motion animated scene, set in Kuwait, based on and partially done by artist Tim Bradstreet, and a Punisher comic book gallery. An extended version of "In Time" by Mark Collie also appears in the closing credits of the extended-cut DVD. This version does not include the special features on the standard DVD release.

The Punisher was released via Blu-ray Disc on June 27, 2006, and only included the theatrical cut.

Accolades

Mark Chadwick won "Best Fire Stunt" at the Taurus World Stunt Awards. Several other crew members were nominated for work on the film: Donna Evans for Best Overall Stunt by a Stunt Woman, Gary Hymes for Best Stunt Coordinator or 2nd Unit Director, and Keii Johnston and Dane Farwell for Best Work with a Vehicle.

The Punisher was also nominated for a Prism Award in the Wide Release Feature Film category.

Music

The score to The Punisher was composed and conducted by Italian composer Carlo Siliotto. Director Jonathan Hensleigh wanted the music to be very emotional, and was aware of Siliotto's previous work which led to him being chosen. When scoring the film Siliotto saw Frank Castle as a tragic figure stating, "This man, Frank Castle, is somebody who has a slaughtered family. He comes through that slaughter, and becomes a punisher. But he's a sad man—he drinks, and has bad memories always coming to him. There's a lot in the film, and at times it is like a modern version of a classic tragedy—like Othello."

Merchandise
Prior to release, a novelization was written by D.A. Stern and released in March 2004. Jane reprised the role of Frank Castle in the 2005 video game The Punisher.

Cancelled sequel and reboot
Lions Gate Entertainment planned to produce a direct sequel titled The Punisher 2, with Avi Arad, chairman and CEO of Marvel Studios, stating that the second film would "become the fifth Marvel property to become a sequel." Jonathan Hensleigh said that he was interested in working with Thomas Jane again for The Punisher 2. Jane said that the villain for The Punisher 2 would be Jigsaw. The project lingered in development for over three years. Jonathan Hensleigh completed a first draft of the script before pulling out around 2006. John Dahl was in talks to direct the film but pulled out due to script quality issues and the studio not wanting to spend a lot of money on the project. In a statement on May 15, 2007, and in two audio interviews Thomas Jane said that he pulled out of the project due to creative differences and the budget of the film being cut, in addition to director Walter Hill being turned down as director by Lionsgate. After reading the new script by Kurt Sutter, Jane stated:

In June 2007, it was reported announced that Lexi Alexander replaced Dahl as director, and that actor Ray Stevenson would replace Thomas Jane in the title role. The Punisher 2 then became Punisher: War Zone, a reboot of The Punisher film series with no connection to the 2004 film. The reboot was released on December 5, 2008. This is the second time the film series has been rebooted, after the 2004 production rebooted 1989's The Punisher. Later it was rebooted again for the third time as a television series released from 2017-2019.

Short film
In July 2012, Jane reprised his role as Frank Castle in the unofficial short film The Punisher: Dirty Laundry, which premiered at the San Diego Comic-Con International. The 10-minute film also stars Ron Perlman.

See also
 Avengers Confidential: Black Widow & Punisher

References

External links

 The Punisher at Marvel.com
 
 
 

Punisher films
2004 films
2004 action films
2000s English-language films
American action films
Columbia Pictures films
Films about Delta Force
American films about revenge
Films set in 2003
Films set in Puerto Rico
Films set in Tampa, Florida
Films shot in Florida
The Punisher (2004 film)
Reboot films
American vigilante films
Artisan Entertainment films
Lionsgate films
Films produced by Avi Arad
Films produced by Gale Anne Hurd
Films with screenplays by Michael France
Films directed by Jonathan Hensleigh
2000s vigilante films
2004 directorial debut films
Films scored by Carlo Siliotto
2000s American films
Live-action films based on Marvel Comics